Francisco Javier Hernández González (born 22 January 1987), known as Javi Chino, is a Spanish footballer who plays for UD Montijo as a midfielder.

Club career
Born in Badajoz, Extremadura, Chino was a CP Flecha Negra youth graduate. In 2006, he joined CD Numancia, making his senior debut with the reserves in the Tercera División.

On 25 March 2007 Chino played his first match as a professional, coming on as a second half substitute for Sietes in a 0–3 away loss against UD Almería in the Segunda División. He left the club in June, and signed for Segunda División B side CD Linares on 9 July.

Chino continued to appear in the lower leagues in the following campaigns, representing CF Badalona, CF Atlético Ciudad, Celta de Vigo B, Sporting Villanueva Promesas, Arroyo CP, Badajoz CF and Mérida AD.

References

External links

1987 births
Living people
Sportspeople from Badajoz
Spanish footballers
Footballers from Extremadura
Association football midfielders
Segunda División players
Segunda División B players
Tercera División players
CD Numancia B players
CD Numancia players
CD Linares players
CF Badalona players
Celta de Vigo B players
Mérida AD players